Vertigo Tango is the fifth studio album by Canadian new wave band Spoons, released in 1988 by Anthem Records.

A moderate commercial success, Vertigo Tango spun off two singles that hit the mid-reaches of the Canadian charts: "When Time Turns Around" and "Waterline".  The group disbanded after the tour to support this album, though they would sporadically reunite in the following years.

Track listing

Singles
 "When Time Turns Around" (ANS-081)
 "Waterline" (ANS-082)
 "Sooner or Later" (ANS-084)

Personnel
 Gordon Deppe - lead vocals, guitar
 Sandy Horne - vocals, bass guitar
 Scott MacDonald - vocals, keyboards
 Steve Kendry - drums, percussion

Production personnel
 John Punter - producer; mixing
 Simon Dawson - engineer
 Mastering at Masterdisk, New York City
 Recorded at Rockfield Studios, Wales

References

1988 albums
Spoons (band) albums